Musgravetown (pop: 561 in 2021) an incorporated municipality in the sheltered southwest corner of Bonavista Bay on the northeast coast of the island of Newfoundland of the Canadian province of Newfoundland and Labrador.

Demographics 

See also
 List of cities and towns in Newfoundland and Labrador

References 

Populated coastal places in Canada
Towns in Newfoundland and Labrador